Shri (born Shrikanth Sriram) is a British multi-instrumentalist and producer. Shri specializes in acoustic, electric, and electronic-based live performances and incorporates traditional Indian instruments into his music.

Biography
Shri grew up in Mumbai, India in a musically inclined family. His father plays the sitar, and his mother and sister play the Carnatic violin. He trained as a classical tabla player for about fourteen years at Pandit Nikhil Ghosh's school in Mumbai. Tired of the rigidity of classical music, Shri went on to teach himself bass, guitar, and flute. His trademark instrument is one he handcrafted and designed himself—a fretless bass guitar suited towards his unique approach of playing bass with a bow.

Career
Having previously played percussion with the rock band Indus Creed, a prominent rock band in India, and bass in the jazz outfit Azure Hades (with whom he recorded an album), he moved to London in the 1990s and collaborated as a bass player with musicians such as Talvin Singh, Nitin Sawhney, and DJ Badmarsh, with whom he recorded under the name Badmarsh & Shri.

Shri toured for five years with Sawhney, which led in 1997 to Shri's first solo album, Drum the Bass, produced by Sawhney and released by London-based label Outcaste Records. Later, Badmarsh & Shri produced two albums for Outcaste Records as a duo, Dancing Drums in 1998 and Signs in 2001. Shri released his second solo album, East Rain, in 2005.

Shri has also collaborated musically on theatrical productions—composing for Akademi's 2001 Coming of Age dance project at London's South Bank, the Builder's Association/Motiroti co-production Alladeen in 2003, and Tamasha Theatre Company's Strictly Dandia in 2005.

In 2007, Shri released the album Seven Steps, which featured the single "Just for a Minute".

In 2011, the artist produced and performed bass and bowed bass on the track "Quest", with Viveick Rajagopalan on the mridangam and kanjira, and Embar Kannan on violin and vocals. "Quest" was released by Folktronic. He also launched a new collaborative project, titled ShriLektric.
The same year, the musician was featured in Season 1, episode 5 of The Dewarists.

In 2015, Shri published the album Just a Vibration, a collaboration with Hammonds Saltaire Brass Band.

Discography

References

External links
 

Asian Underground musicians
Desi musicians
Tabla players
British people of Indian descent
Living people
Year of birth missing (living people)
Musicians from Bangalore
21st-century Indian musicians